Lexia is a suburb of Perth, Western Australia, located in the City of Swan local government area.

References

Suburbs of Perth, Western Australia
Suburbs and localities in the City of Swan